The 1903 German football championship Final decided the winner of the 1903 German football championship, the 1st edition of the German football championship, a knockout football cup competition contested by the regional league winners to determine the national champions. The match was played on 31 May 1903 at the Exerzierweide in Altona. VfB Leipzig won the match 7–2 against DFC Prag to become the first national champions in German football history.

Route to the final
The German football championship was a six team single-elimination knockout cup competition, featuring the champions of regional football associations. There were a total of two rounds leading up to the final. For all matches, the winner after 90 minutes advances. If still tied, extra time was used to determine the winner.

Note: In all results below, the score of the finalist is given first (H: home; A: away; N: neutral).

Match

Details

References

1903
1902–03 in German football
1. FC Lokomotive Leipzig matches
DFC Prag matches
Football competitions in Hamburg
May 1903 sports events
1900s in Hamburg